Richard Gunn may refer to:

Richard Gunn (actor), American actor
Richard Gunn (boxer) (1871–1961), British Olympic boxer

See also
Rick Gunn, member of the North Carolina Senate